Pelangi (means Rainbow in English) was 24-hour Indonesian language channel which broadcasts Indonesian films and dramas (as of 2011). This channel was only available on Astro in the Indo Pek package. Most of the programmes are available in Malay subtitles.

The channel was a collaboration between Astro and NET. from Indonesia, and as such, NET. programs comprises for 100% of the channel's contents.

Indo Pek
Beginning 11 July 2011, Astro launched a new package named Indo Pek (means "Indo Pack" in English), which contains 2 new Astro channels named Bintang (Channel 141 on Astro) and Pelangi (Channel 142 on Astro).

As of 2011, Pelangi has the best dramas, as well as from the old to the latest movies all from Indonesia.

The channel broadcast the program from NET. TV and entire dramas has been move to Bintang. After nine years of broadcast, Pelangi and Bintang ceased broadcasting on 1 June 2020 at 12:00 am, ceased transmission message shows "Please note. Bintang and Pelangi Channels have been terminated and are no longer on the list. Indopek customers can continue to enjoy brand new content in high definition through Astro Rania HD (112) and Astro Aura HD (113) channels starting 23 May 2020." and replaced by Astro Aura HD.

See also
 Bintang
 Astro (satellite television)

References

Astro Malaysia Holdings television channels
Television channels and stations established in 2011
Television channels and stations disestablished in 2020